Charlie Francis is a Scottish film director who is possibly best known for his directorial work on the short film Middle Man The film was awarded Best British Short at the Iris Film Festival which included a sponsored prize from Pinewood Studios. On 19 March 2015, it was announced by BAFTA Scotland that the film was nominated for the Best Entertainment accolade at the 2015 British Academy Scotland New Talent Awards.

Filmography

Awards

References

External links

British film directors
Scottish film directors
Living people
Year of birth missing (living people)
Place of birth missing (living people)